The kwitra  (also  quwaytara, kouitra and quitra); Arabic الكوترة or عود أندلسي (literally Andalusian oud); is an Algerian stringed instrument, sometimes referred to as the Algerian lute. The instrument is tied to Andalusian musical traditions of Moorish people who were pushed out of the Iberian peninsula in the 15th century. That tradition has shrunk further; where the kwitra was once seen in Algeria, today it is mainly an Algerian instrument.

The literal meaning of kwitra in Algerian Arabic (and possibly in the extinct Andalusian Arabic) is "small guitar". It is a regional instrument in the lute family of instruments, related to Italian chitarra.

It has eight strings in four courses. It is tuned G3 G3, E4 E4, A3 A3, D4 D4. The traditional strings are made of animal intestines. They usually have a carved soundhole in the shape of a bowl or vase.

Historically prominent musicians
Sfinja
Mouzino
Ben Teffahi
Ahmed Essabti
Mohammed Bahar (recordings exist)
Philippe Lourenço
Faten Sioud
Ahmed Echaytan

See also

References

External links 

Video. Mohammed Bahar playing the kwitra
Modern recording, kwitra being played in style of Mohamed Bahar.
 The stringed Instrument Database 
 El Kouitra
 Colloque sur le oud maghrébin à quatre cordes

String instruments
Algerian musical instruments